Aquadeo is a resort village in the Canadian province of Saskatchewan within Census Division No. 17. It is on the shores of Jackfish Lake in the Rural Municipality of Meota No. 468.

History 
Aquadeo incorporated as a resort village on January 1, 1988. The name is a portmanteau of "aquatic" and "rodeo".

Demographics 

Government 
The Resort Village of Aquadeo is governed by an elected municipal council and an appointed administrator that meets on the third Wednesday of every month. The mayor is Peter Delainey and its administrator is Brian de Montbrun.

See also
List of communities in Saskatchewan
List of municipalities in Saskatchewan
List of resort villages in Saskatchewan
List of villages in Saskatchewan
List of summer villages in Alberta

References

External links 

Resort villages in Saskatchewan
Meota No. 468, Saskatchewan
Division No. 17, Saskatchewan